The Nigeria national women's football team, nicknamed the Super Falcons, represents Nigeria in international women's football and is controlled by the Nigeria Football Federation. The team is by far Africa's most successful international women's football team winning a record eleven Women's Africa Cup of Nations titles, with their most recent title in 2018, after defeating South Africa in the final. The team is also the only women's national team from the Confederation of African Football to have reached the quarterfinals in both the FIFA Women's World Cup and Football at the Summer Olympics.

They are also one of the few teams in the world to have qualified for every edition of the FIFA Women's World Cup, with their best performance at the 1999 FIFA Women's World Cup where they reached the quarterfinals.

History
They won the first seven African championships and through their first twenty years lost only five games to African competition.12 December 2002 to Ghana in Warri, 3 June 2007 at Algeria, 12 August 2007 to Ghana in an Olympic qualifier, 25 November 2008 at Equatorial Guinea in the semis of the 2008 Women's African Football Championship and May 2011 at Ghana in an All Africa Games qualification match.

The Super Falcons have been unable to dominate beyond Africa in such arenas as the FIFA Women's World Cup or the Olympic Games however. The team has been to every World Cup since 1991, but managed just once to finish in the top eight. In 2003, the Super Falcons turned out to be the biggest disappointment of the first round, failing to score a single goal and losing all three Group A matches. They did little better in 2007, drawing only one of their Group B matches. However, they faced the group of death in both 2003 and 2007, grouped both times with rising Asian power North Korea, traditional European power Sweden, and a historic women's superpower in the USA.

Nigeria hosted the African women's championship finals for the third time in 2006 which were then canceled due to a severe outbreak of gang induced violence within the Nigerian area, replacing Gabon, which was initially granted the right to host but later pulled out citing financial difficulties, and won it for the seventh time in a row. Nigeria's Super Falcons and Ghana's Black Queens represented Africa in China for the 2007 FIFA Women's World Cup.

The "Falconets" are the country's junior team (U-20), which performed creditably in the 2006 FIFA U-20 Women's World Cup held in Russia when they beat Finland 8–0 before they were sent packing by Brazil in the Quarter-finals. They were the runner-up to Germany at the 2010 FIFA U-20 Women's World Cup. Nigeria also played in the 2014 FIFA U-20 Women's World Cup held in Canada and lost to Germany in the finals 0–1, Asisat Oshoala got both the golden ball and golden boot.

The "Flamingoes" are the country's cadet team (U-17), which qualified for the inaugural women's U-17 World Cup New Zealand 2008. Nigeria qualified for the 2019 FIFA Women's World Cup where they were placed in Group A with South Korea, Norway and hosts France.

Team image

Nicknames
The Nigeria women's national football team has been known or nicknamed as the "Super Falcons".

FIFA world rankings

 Worst Ranking   Best Ranking   Worst Mover   Best Mover

Results and fixtures

The following is a list of match results in the last 12 months, as well as any future matches that have been scheduled.

Legend

2022

2023

Nigeria Results and Fixtures – Soccerway.com
global sport

Coaching staff

Current coaching staff

Manager history

Players

Current squad
Coach:  Randy Waldrum

The squad was announced on 26 January 2023 for the 2023 Women's Revelations Cup.

Recent call-ups
Following players have been called up to a squad in the past 12 months.

This list may be incomplete.

Previous squads
Bold indicates winning squads

FIFA Women's World Cup
1991 FIFA Women's World Cup squad
1995 FIFA Women's World Cup squad
1999 FIFA Women's World Cup squad
2003 FIFA Women's World Cup squad
2007 FIFA Women's World Cup squad
2011 FIFA Women's World Cup squad
2015 FIFA Women's World Cup squad
2019 FIFA Women's World Cup squad

Olympic Games
2000 Summer Olympics squad
2004 Summer Olympics squad
2008 Summer Olympics squad
Africa Women Cup of Nations
2000 African Women's Championship squad
2010 African Women's Championship squad
2012 African Women's Championship squad
2014 African Women's Championship squad
2016 Africa Women Cup of Nations squad
2018 Africa Women Cup of Nations squad
2022 Africa Women Cup of Nations squad

Captains

 Asisat Oshoala (????–)

Records

*Active players in bold, statistics as of November 2020.

Most capped players

Top goalscorers

Honours

Intercontinental
FIFA Women's World Cup
Quarterfinals: 1999
Round of 16: 2019
Best Jersey:  2019
Olympic Games
Quarterfinals: 2004

Continental
 Africa Women Cup of Nations
  Champions: 1991, 1995, 1998, 2000, 2002, 2004, 2006, 2010, 2014, 2016, 2018
 Third-place: 2008
African Games
 Gold Medal: 2003,  2007
Fourth-place: 2015

Regional
2019 WAFU Zone B Women's Cup
 Winners: 2019 
 Bronze: 2018

Other tournaments
2019 Four Nations Tournament (women's football)
 Third-place

Awards
African Women's National Team of the Year
Winners: (2010, 2014, 2016, 2018)

Competitive record

FIFA Women's World Cup

Olympic Games

Africa Women Cup of Nations

African Games

2019 edition of the football tournament was played by the U-20 team.

WAFU Women's Cup record

Other tournaments

All−time record against FIFA recognized nations
The list shown below shows the Djibouti national football team all−time international record against opposing nations.
*As of xxxxxx after match against  xxxx.
Key

Record per opponent
*As ofxxxxx after match against  xxxxx.
Key

The following table shows Djibouti's all-time official international record per opponent:

See also

Sport in Nigeria
Football in Nigeria
Women's football in Nigeria
Nigeria women's national under-20 football team
Nigeria women's national under-17 football team
NWFL Premiership
Nigeria men's national football team

References

External links
 Official website
 FIFA profile

 
African women's national association football teams
Women's national sports teams of Nigeria